Bangladesh–Chile relations refer to the diplomatic relations between People's Republic of Bangladesh and Republic of Chile. Both the countries are members of Group of 77 and Non-Aligned Movement.

High level visits 
In 2011, former foreign secretary of Bangladesh Mohamed Mijarul Quayes paid an official visit to Chile.

Economic cooperations 
Bangladesh and Chile have always expressed their interest to expand the bilateral trade between the two countries. Because of its strategic location, Chile has been identified as an important market for the expansion of Bangladeshi products in Latin America. Many Bangladeshi companies have entered the Chilean market, the most prominent being Beximco Pharmaceuticals which, after entering the Chilean market, became the first Bangladeshi pharmaceutical company in 2008 to obtain product registration in any Latin American country.

According to a report published by Chilean foreign ministry's General Directorate of International Economic Relations in 2012, Bangladesh was among the leading Asian destinations for Chilean investment.

In 2013, Chile granted duty-free and quota-free access to the Bangladeshi products in order to strengthen bilateral trade between the two countries. The bilateral trade between the two countries stands at $30.37 million as of June 2013, with all of the trade accounting for Bangladeshi export to Chile. About 93% of the Bangladeshi export to Chile was of textiles and ready made garments. The rest included jute yarn, jute fabrics, foot wears, caps and pharmaceuticals products.

References 

 
Chile
Bilateral relations of Chile